Charles Bertie may refer to:

Charles Bertie (senior) (c. 1640–1711), British diplomat
Charles Bertie (died 1730) (c. 1678–1730), his son, Member of Parliament for Stamford
Charles Bertie (1683–1727), Member of Parliament for New Woodstock
Charles Bertie (professor) (c. 1679–1746/7), Rector of Kenn and Sedleian Professor of Natural Philosophy